Three ships of the United States Navy have been named USS Lake Champlain, after the Battle of Lake Champlain in the War of 1812.

, was a cargo ship in use during 1918 and 1919 and then sold
, was an aircraft carrier in service from 1945 to 1966
, is a guided missile cruiser commissioned in 1988 and currently in active service

References

United States Navy ship names